The 2018 Australian GT Championship was the 22nd running of the Australian GT Championship, a CAMS-sanctioned Australian motor racing championship open to FIA GT3 cars and similar cars as approved for the championship. The championship commenced on 23 March 2018 at the Melbourne Grand Prix Circuit and concluded on 14 October at Hampton Downs Motorsport Park. The 2018 Australian Endurance Championship was contested concurrently with Rounds 2, 4 and 6 of the GT Championship. It was the 15th Australian Endurance Championship.

The Australian GT Championship was won by Geoff Emery driving an Audi R8 LMS and the Australian Endurance Championship by Max Twigg and Tony D'Alberto who shared a Mercedes-AMG GT3.

Race calendar

The Australian GT Championship was contested over six rounds and the Australian Endurance Championship over three rounds. Each race, with the exception of the Australian Grand Prix round of the Australian GT Championship, included at least one compulsory timed pit stop.

Australian GT Championship

Australian Endurance Championship

Australian GT Championship

Teams and drivers
{|
|-
|

{|
| valign="top" |

Race results

Points system
Points were awarded as follows:

Championship standings
The Australian GT Championship was won by Geoff Emery.

Championship standings after five of six rounds were as follows:

Australian GT4 standings
The GT4 Division was won by Jeremy Gray driving an Aston Martin Vantage.

Australian Endurance Championship

Teams and drivers
{|
|-
|

Race results

Points system
Points are awarded as follows:

Championship standings
The Australian Endurance Championship was won by Max Twigg and Tony D'Alberto.

Championship standings after two of three rounds were as follows:

See also
 2018 Australian GT Trophy Series

References

Australian GT Championship
GT Championship
Australian Endurance Championship